Lenhard Ng (born 1976, United States) is an American mathematician, working primarily on symplectic geometry. Ng is a professor of mathematics at Duke University.

Background and education 
Lenhard Ng is an American of Chinese descent. His father, Jack Ng, is a professor of physics at University of North Carolina Chapel Hill.

Lenhard earned his B.A. summa cum laude in Mathematics and Physics from Harvard University in three years and his Ph.D. in Mathematics from the Massachusetts Institute of Technology in 2001.

He is married to Astrid Giugni.

Child prodigy 
Ng was a child prodigy who was once thought to be the "smartest kid in America". At age 10, he earned a perfect score of 800 on the math portion of what is now called the SAT-I, a feat considered to be a “remarkable achievement” when a high school junior or senior did it. He was the youngest person to have achieved this feat on his first try. At the age of 11, he earned a perfect score on the College Board Test of Standard Written English. He earned a perfect score on the American High School Mathematics Examination in all 4 years of high school at Chapel Hill High School (Chapel Hill, North Carolina). He attended the Johns Hopkins Center for Talented Youth and was one of the gifted children included in the Study of Mathematically Precocious Youth longitudinal cohort. He was estimated to be 1 in approximately 30 million of his age-mates.

At the age of 12, he began taking courses (on a part-time basis) at the University of North Carolina, Chapel Hill. He was not yet 13 when he won the Written Round of the MATHCOUNTS competition.  At the age of 14, he participated in the International Mathematical Olympiad and earned a Silver medal. He participated in this competition for the next two years and earned Gold medals. He entered college (Harvard University) full-time at the age of 16 and majored in Mathematics and Physics, graduating summa cum laude in three years. He competed in the William Lowell Putnam Mathematical Competition while at Harvard University and was a three-time fellow (in 1993, 1994, and 1995), one of only 18 people to have achieved this feat since 1938. The first time he became a Putnam Fellow was at the age of 16, making him one of only 6 people (the 5 others being Arthur Rubin, Noam Elkies, Don Zagier, David Ash and John Tillinghast) in the history of the competition to have achieved this feat.

Mathematical work 

Ng works in contact and symplectic geometry.  His Ph.D. thesis and several other papers concern Legendrian knots, and his best-known work applies symplectic field theory to derive invariants of (topological) knots.  More precisely, the conormal bundle of a knot embedded in the three-sphere is a Legendrian torus inside the three-sphere's unit cosphere bundle (a contact five-manifold).  Relative contact homology produces symplectic invariants of this pair, which give topological invariants of the knot.  Ng computed the linearized contact homology in this case, providing an entirely combinatorial model for it which is a powerful knot invariant.

Recognition
He was included in the 2019 class of fellows of the American Mathematical Society "for contributions to Floer homology and low-dimensional topology and service to the mathematical community".

References 

Ng, Lenhard. Knot and braid invariants from contact homology I. Geom. Topol. 9 (2005), 247–297.
Ng, Lenhard.  Knot and braid invariants from contact homology II. Geom. Topol. 9 (2005), 1603–1637.

External links 
 Lenny Ng's home page
 Lenny Ng: AMS-MAA-SIAM Frank and Brennie Morgan Prize for Outstanding Research in Mathematics by an Undergraduate Student (Honorable Mention)
 Lenny Ng's Putnam Exam Record
 
 

American people of Chinese descent
20th-century American mathematicians
21st-century American mathematicians
Harvard University alumni
Duke University faculty
1976 births
Living people
Massachusetts Institute of Technology School of Science alumni
International Mathematical Olympiad participants
Fellows of the American Mathematical Society
Chapel Hill High School (Chapel Hill, North Carolina) alumni
Putnam Fellows